Laurens De Plus (born 4 September 1995) is a Belgian cyclist, who currently rides for UCI WorldTeam . He was named in the start list for the 2017 Giro d'Italia. In July 2019, he was named in the startlist for the 2019 Tour de France. He is the older brother of fellow racing cyclist Jasper De Plus.

Major results

2013
 5th Overall Ain'Ternational–Rhône Alpes–Valromey Tour
 7th La Philippe Gilbert juniors
 8th Overall Giro della Lunigiana
2015
 1st Ghent–Staden
 2nd Overall Ronde de l'Isard
1st  Points classification
1st  Young rider classification
 2nd Overall Giro della Valle d'Aosta
1st  Points classification
1st Stage 1
 4th Overall Grand Prix Priessnitz spa
 4th Coppa dei Laghi-Trofeo Almar
 5th Flèche Ardennaise
 6th Overall Tour Alsace
 8th Overall Tour de l'Avenir
2017
 3rd Overall Ster ZLM Toer
 10th Brabantse Pijl
2018
 1st  Team time trial, UCI Road World Championships
 4th Time trial, National Road Championships
 8th Overall Tour of California
2019
 1st  Overall BinckBank Tour
 1st Stage 2 (TTT) Tour de France
 9th Overall UAE Tour
1st Stage 1 (TTT)
2021
 10th GP Miguel Induráin

Grand Tour general classification results timeline

References

External links

 
 
 
 
 
 
 
 

1995 births
Living people
Belgian male cyclists
Sportspeople from Aalst, Belgium
Cyclists from East Flanders
Olympic cyclists of Belgium
Cyclists at the 2016 Summer Olympics